The Danish Nurses' Organization (abbrev. DNO; in Danish Dansk Sygeplejeråd, abbrev. DSR) is a trade union in Denmark. It represents 95% of all nurses with a membership of 75,000.

The DNO is affiliated with the FTF – Confederation of Professionals in Denmark and Public Services International.

The motto of The Danish Nurses' Organization is: We move borders—in the organization, profession and society.

References

External links
Official site of The Danish Nurses' Organization
Information about The Danish Nurses' Organization

FTF – Confederation of Professionals in Denmark
Public Services International
1899 establishments in Denmark
Healthcare trade unions in Denmark
Trade unions established in 1899
Nursing organizations